DKT International (DKT) is a charitable non-profit organization that promotes family planning and HIV prevention through social marketing. The Washington, D.C.-based DKT was founded in 1989 by Phil Harvey and operates in 90 countries in Africa, Asia, and Latin America. Its revenue largely comes from sales of low-cost contraceptives. In 2021, DKT sold 901 million condoms, 111 million cycles of oral contraceptives, 26.5 million injectable contraceptives, 20 million emergency contraceptives and 4.7 million intrauterine devices (IUDs), among other products, in 59 countries. This is equivalent to 54.2 million couple years of protection (CYPs), making DKT one of the largest private providers of contraceptives in the developing world. The average cost per CYP was US$1.65. DKT's marketing strategies have included advertising, creating location-specific brands, working with social networks and militaries, and targeting high-risk groups. DKT also works with health workers and clinics that provide family planning products, information, and services. Charity Navigator has given DKT a four-star rating for its finances, with 96.5% of its budget going towards programs and 3.4% towards headquarters expenses and fund raising in 2019.

History
Phil Harvey, the founder of DKT, became interested in family planning in 1968 while working on emergency food relief for CARE International in India. In 1970, he and his fellow University of North Carolina student Tim Black founded the business Adam & Eve in order to finance their charitable activities, and also founded the non-profit health organization Population Services International that same year. DKT International, named for D.K. Tyagi, an early pioneer of family planning in India, was founded in 1989. DKT has grown rapidly over the years; its revenue from selling contraceptives increased from US$4.5 million in 1996 to $167.7 million in 2020, and its couple years of protection increased from 5.7 million in 2002 to 54.2 million in 2021.

In 2006, DKT International refused to take the U.S. government's anti-prostitution pledge, feeling the pledge would interfere with its HIV/AIDS services worldwide. DKT challenged the pledge as a violation of First Amendment rights, with the support of the American Civil Liberties Union (ACLU). Judge Emmet G. Sullivan ruled in favor of DKT in the District Court for the District of Columbia on 18 May 2006, but the D.C. Court of Appeals reversed the decision on 27 February 2007.

In 2013, a different organization successfully challenged the pledge before the U.S. Supreme Court in Agency for International Development v. Alliance for Open Society International, Inc.

Organization
On 31 December 2013, Phil Harvey stepped down as president after 24 years, and was replaced by Christopher Purdy. Its board includes Robert Ciszewski, Carlos Garcia, Christopher Purdy, Matthew Reeves and Julie Stewart. Purdy also serves as chair of the board.

In 2020, 66.8% of DKT's revenue was from contraceptive sales and related services, 26.7% from grants and contracts and 6.5% from other income. 52.2% of expenses were related to program costs, 44.a% to contraceptive costs, 1.4% to headquarters, 0.3% to fundraising and 2.1% to other expenses. Revenue from contraceptive sales first exceeded donor support in 2005.

For its first 26 years, DKT established stand-alone programs in each country and focused on countries with large markets, such as Ethiopia, Brazil and the Philippines. Eventually, though, DKT managers saw the benefits of a regional approach that can serve the reproductive health needs of multiple countries, including smaller ones. Therefore, DKT established its first regional program in French-speaking West and Central Africa in 2015. Since then, DKT has established six other regional platforms with two or more countries. These programs require fewer financial resources per country (and streamlined back office support), and leverages the common language, culture and regulatory environment of the region.

In 2017, DKT launched DKT WomanCare, a marketing and distribution platform to advance DKT’s mission of providing people around the world with reproductive health options. In close partnership with manufacturers, DKT WomanCare provides global integrated supply chain and marketing support. It sells a range of reproductive health products to multilateral bodies, ministries of health, commercial entities and social marketing and family planning organizations, and supports product launches and sales with marketing and training of health providers. in 2021, WomanCare sold products in 102 countries.

In 2021, DKT WomanCare sold 253,512 manual vacuum aspiration kits, 1.5 million cannulae and 1.7 million implants in 90 countries, producing 2 million couple years of protection.

Donors
As of 2022, DKT International's donors include: Bill & Melinda Gates Foundation, Children's Investment Fund Foundation, David and Lucile Packard Foundation, Embassy of the Kingdom of the Netherlands, Embassy of Sweden, Erik and Edith Bergstrom Foundation, (British) Foreign, Commonwealth & Development Office, Gates Philanthropy Partners, Government of Germany (KfW Development Bank), Government of India, Government of Sweden, National Postcode Lottery (Netherlands), Preston-Werner Ventures, Swedish International Development Agency (SIDA), United Nations Office for Project Services (UNOPS), United Nations Population Fund (UNFPA), WestWind Foundation, William and Flora Hewlett Foundation and anonymous donors.

Programs
As of 2021, DKT International had 23 programs with sales in 59 countries in Africa, Asia, and Latin America. Some platforms serve more than one country.

References

External links
 Official website
 DKT International on Charity Navigator
 DKT WomanCare

International charities
Health charities in the United States
Birth control providers
HIV/AIDS prevention organizations
Organizations established in 1989
Non-profit organizations based in Washington, D.C.
Medical and health organizations based in Washington, D.C.